Hummin' Comin' at 'Cha is the debut studio album by American R&B singing group Xscape. Released on October 12, 1993, by So So Def Recordings (as the label's inaugural release) and Columbia Records, the album produced the singles "Just Kickin' It", "Understanding", "Love on My Mind" and “Tonight”, and peaked at number 17 on the Billboard 200 and number 3 on the U.S. Billboard Top R&B/Hip-Hop albums chart, becoming certified platinum by the RIAA with sales over one million copies sold.

Track listing

Credits and personnel

Musicians
LaMarquis Mark Jefferson - bass, guitar
Jermaine Dupri - piano
Jermaine Dupri, Francesca Restrepo - art direction
McKinley Horton - keyboard, product
Kevin Lively, Phil Tan- engineer
Bernie Grundman, Joe Nicolo, Phil Nicolo, Howie Weinberg- mastering
Jermaine Dupri, Phil Tan- mixing

Production
Vocal assistance: Dionne Farris
Executive Producer: Jermaine Dupri, M 2 Da T 2 Da M

Charts

Weekly charts

Year-end charts

Certifications

References

1993 debut albums
Columbia Records albums
Xscape (group) albums
Albums produced by Jermaine Dupri